The IFSS On-Snow World Championships are a biannual sled dog racing event organized by the International Federation of Sleddog Sports (IFSS). The On-Snow World Championships was started in 1990 and was first hosted in St. Moritz, Switzerland.

Editions

External links
IFSS World Championships History
 Medalists of IFSS Championships

Dog sledding races
Recurring sporting events established in 1990